"Boy Is a Bottom" is a song by American singer and drag queen Willam Belli, featuring Detox and Vicky Vox (DWV). The song was released to coincide with the fifth season premiere of RuPaul's Drag Race. The original music video went viral. As of June 2021, the clip has been viewed over 25 million times since uploaded to YouTube on 28 January 2013.

On January 13, 2015, Willam released a Spanish version of the song, called "Es Una Pasiva".

Background and composition
The song is a parody of "Girl on Fire" by Alicia Keys and also features an altered version of the "breakdown" from "My Lovin' (You're Never Gonna Get It)" by En Vogue. "Bottom" is also a term referring to a male who prefers to be on the receiving end of gay anal sex, the opposite of a "top". Willam had previously collaborated with Detox and Vicky Vox on "Chow Down", a parody of "Hold On" by Wilson Phillips. The song was written by Willam Belli, Detox, and Vicky Vox and was produced by Markaholic.

The Spanish version of the song, "Es Una Pasiva", includes interpolations of "La Bamba" by Ritchie Valens, "La Isla Bonita" by Madonna, "Macarena" by Los Del Rio and "Bidi Bidi Bom Bom" by Selena.

Critical reception
Andrew Villagomez, writing for Out, described the song as a "juicy and fantastic musical number".

Commercial performance
"Boy Is a Bottom" debuted at number six on Billboards Comedy Digital Songs, selling 3,000 downloads in its first week. Willam has had two previous songs on the chart but neither cracked the top ten.

Live performances
Willam, Detox, and Vicky Vox performed the song as part of the 2013 White Party in Palm Springs, California. Willam performed the song as part of Gay Pride Parade 2014.  After the group split, Belli released a Spanish version called "Es Una Pasiva."  This version is the one he now performs stating he can no longer perform Boy is a Bottom as a solo in English.

Track listing

Charts

References

2013 singles
Comedy songs
LGBT-related songs
Viral videos
Willam Belli songs
2013 songs
2013 YouTube videos